ECFR may refer to:

 East County Fire & Rescue, a public safety provider in Clark County, Washington.
 Electronic Code of Federal Regulations (e-CFR).
 Enka-Candler Fire & Rescue, a public safety provider near Asheville, North Carolina.
 European Council for Fatwa and Research, a private foundation composed of Islamic clerics and scholars.
 European Council on Foreign Relations, a pan-European foreign policy think tank.